The 2013–14 Kosovar Cup was the football knockout competition of Kosovo in the 2013–14 season.

1/8 Final
These matches were played on 28, 29, November 30, 2013

|-

|}

Quarterfinal
These matches will be played on 28 February and 1, 2 and March 3, 2014

|-

|}

Semifinals
First legs on 9 and 10 April 2014, second legs on 7 and 8 May 2014

|}

Final

References 

Cup
Kosovar Cup seasons
Kosovo